Komissarov (Komissaroff, Komissarow, or Komissarova (feminine), is a Slavic surname, which may refer to:

 Aleksandr Pavlovich Komissarov (born 1950), Russian professional football coach
 Daniel Semyonovich Komissarov (1907–2008), Russian Iranologist and distinguished professor of Persian literature
 Vilen Naumovich Komissarov (1924–2005) Russian linguist, translator, and professor
 Maria Komissarova, (born 1990) Russian freestyle skier
 Oksana Komissarova, (born 1964) Russian swimmer

Russian-language surnames